Marengo Township is located in McHenry County, Illinois. As of the 2020 census, its population was 7,202 and it contained 3,065 housing units. Marengo is a city located in the township.

Geography

Demographics

References

External links
 Marengo Township Website
City-data.com
Illinois State Archives

Townships in McHenry County, Illinois
Townships in Illinois